Róbert Honti (born 30 January 1943) is a Hungarian middle-distance runner. He competed in the men's 800 metres at the 1968 Summer Olympics.

References

1943 births
Living people
Athletes (track and field) at the 1968 Summer Olympics
Hungarian male middle-distance runners
Olympic athletes of Hungary
Place of birth missing (living people)
20th-century Hungarian people